was a Japanese anime director and storyboard artist. He was known for directing series such as Beast Wars II, Beast Wars Neo, Cross Game, Strawberry 100%, and Transformers: Robots in Disguise, as well as the OVA series Osu!! Karate Bu, Shin Captain Tsubasa, and U-Jin Brand.

Sekita was a member of Dream Force and had worked on Hal Film Maker and Synergy SP productions. He was also a member of the former Junio Brain Trust.

Works

TV animation
Shin Don Chuck Monogatari (1976–1978, episode director)
Kagaku Bōkentai Dancer 5 (1979–1980, episode director)
Mobile Suit Gundam (1979–1980, episode director)
The Ultraman (1979–1980, episode director, storyboards)
Zenderman (1979–1980, episode director)
Space Runaway Ideon (1980–1981, episode director)
Taiyō no Shisha Tetsujin 28-gō (1980–1981, episode director)
Superbook (1981–1982, episode director)
Fang of the Sun Dougram (1981–1983, episode director)
Urusei Yatsura (1981–1986, episode director, storyboards)
Asari-chan (1982–1983, episode director)
Combat Mecha Xabungle (1982–1983, episode director, storyboards)
Aura Battler Dunbine (1983–1984, episode director, storyboards)
Ginga Hyōryū Vifam (1983–1984, episode director)
Plawres Sanshiro (1982–1984, episode director)
Chōriki Robo Galatt (1984–1985, episode director, storyboards)
Heavy Metal L-Gaim (1984–1985, episode director, storyboards)
Mobile Suit Zeta Gundam (1985–1986, episode director, storyboards)
Metal Armor Dragonar (1987–1988, episode director)
Mobile Suit Gundam ZZ (1986–1987, episode director, storyboards)
Maison Ikkoku (1986–1988, episode director)
Yoroiden Samurai Troopers (1988–1989, episode director, storyboards)
Jushin Liger (1989–1990, episode director)
The Brave Fighter of Legend Da-Garn (1992–1993, episode director, storyboards)
The Brave Express Might Gaine (1993–1994, episode director)
Mobile Suit Victory Gundam (1993–1994, episode director)
Yaiba (1993–1994, episode director)
Saber Marionette J (1996–1997, episode director)
Hakugei: Legend of the Moby Dick (1997–1999, episode director)
Beast Wars II (1998–1999, series director, storyboards)
Beast Wars Neo (1999, series director, episode director, storyboards)
Transformers: Robots in Disguise (2000, series director, episode director, storyboards)
Chobits (2002, episode director)
Pita-Ten (2002, episode director)
GetBackers (2002–2003, episode director)
Mobile Suit Gundam SEED (2002–2003, episode director)
Princess Tutu (2002–2003, episode director)
Bakuten Shoot: Beyblade G Revolution (2003, episode director)
Scrapped Princess (2003, episode director)
W Wish (2004–2005, series director, episode director, storyboards)
Sgt. Frog (since 2004, episode director)
Strawberry 100% (2005, series director, episode director, storyboards)
The Law of Ueki (2005–2006, episode director)
Crash B-Daman (2006, episode director)
Higurashi no Naku Koro ni (2006, episode director)
Strain: Strategic Armored Infantry (2006–2007, episode director)
Hero Tales (2007–2008, series director, episode director, storyboards)
Porphy no Nagai Tabi (2008, episode director)
Zettai Karen Children (2008–2009, episode director)
Cross Game (2009–2010, series director, episode director, storyboards)

Sources:

OVAs
Heavy Metal L-Gaim (1986–1987, episode director, storyboards)
Dirty Pair (1987–1988, episode director)
Twin (1989, director)
Shin Captain Tsubasa (1989–1990, series director)
Osu!! Karate Bu (1990–1992, series director)
Kumo in Noru (1991, director)
Maji! Risshi-hen (1991, director)
U-Jin Brand (1991, director)
Utchare Gosho Kawara (1991, director)
Yokohama Meibutsu: Otoko Katayama-gumi (1991, supervising director)
Don: Gokudō Suikoden (1992, director)
Princess Army: Wedding Combat (1992, director)
Gorillaman (1992–1993, director)
My My Mai (1993–1994, director)
Bad Boys (1993–1998, episode director)
Fencer of Minerva (1994, episode director)
Homeroom Affairs (1994, director)
Shonan Junai Gumi! 5: Last Signal (1997, director)
Moeyo Ken (2003–2004, episode director, storyboards)
Ghost Talker's Daydream (2004, series director, episode director, storyboards)

Sources:

Films
Mobile Suit SD Gundam (1988, director)

References

External links

Year of birth missing
Anime directors
2019 deaths
Japanese storyboard artists